Henley may refer to:

Places

United Kingdom
 Henley, Dorset, a location
 Henley, Gloucestershire, a location
 Henley-on-Thames, a town in South Oxfordshire, England
 Henley (UK Parliament constituency)
 Henley Rural District, a former rural district in Oxfordshire
 Henley, Acton Scott, a location in Shropshire
 Henley, Bitterley, a location in Shropshire
 Henley, Suffolk, a village in Suffolk, England
 Henley, Somerset, a hamlet south of Crewkerne, England
 Henley Fort, Victorian fort near Guildford, Surrey
 Henley-in-Arden, a small town in Warwickshire, England
 Henley, West Sussex, a location
 Henley, Box, Wiltshire
 Henley, Buttermere, Wiltshire

United States
 Henley, Missouri, an unincorporated community in southwestern Cole County
 Henley, Ohio, an unincorporated community
 Henley, Oregon, unincorporated community in Klamath County, Oregon, United States
 Henley Cay, tropical islet in the United States Virgin Islands

Elsewhere
 Henley, New South Wales, a suburb of Sydney, Australia
 Henley, New Zealand, a town in the South Island of New Zealand
 Henley River, river in Kenora District in Northwestern Ontario, Canada
 Henley Beach, South Australia, a coastal suburb of Adelaide

Education 
 Henley Business School, UK
 Henley Business School, South Africa, one of its several affiliates
 Henley College (disambiguation)
 Henley High School (disambiguation)

People 
 Henley (name), a list of people with the surname
 Baron Henley, titles in the Peerage of Great Britain and in the Peerage of Ireland
 William Ernest Henley, the late Victorian poet, editor, and critic
 Justice Henley (disambiguation), several people

Sport

Rowing
 Henley Boat Races, for crews not in the main Oxford-Cambridge Boat Race
 Henley Royal Regatta, annual rowing event on the river Thames
 Henley Women's Regatta
 Royal Canadian Henley Regatta, annual rowing event held in St. Catharines, Ontario, Canada
 American Henley Regatta, a regatta held in the nineteenth century as the U.S. national championships

Other
 Henley Hawks, a rugby union club based in Henley-on-Thames, England

Military 
 Hawker Henley, aircraft used by the RAF in World War II
 USS Henley, four American warships

Other uses
 Henley & Partners, global citizenship and residence advisory firm based in London
 Henley shirt, a collarless casual shirt
 Henley Forklift

See also
 Hanley (disambiguation)
 Hendley
 Henle (disambiguation)
 Henleys
 Hennelly
 Hensley (disambiguation)
 Honley
 Hunley